Bror Emil Hildebrand (22February 1806 in Madesjö30August 1884) was a Swedish archaeologist, numismatist and museum director. From 1837 to 1879 he was Custodian of Ancient Monuments and Secretary of the Royal Swedish Academy of Letters. From 1847 he was a member of the Royal Swedish Academy of Sciences, and from 1866 a member of the Swedish Academy. In 1866, he founded the Swedish History Museum in Stockholm.

In 1830 Hildebrand became reader in numismatics at the University of Lund. About this time he was also taught archaeology by C.J. Thomsen in nearby Copenhagen. This led to Hildebrand's introduction of Thomsen's famous three-age system in Sweden. His main scholarly legacy lies within the field of Medieval Anglo-Saxon numismatics, where he produced pioneering catalogues and studies. Much of this work was indirectly due to agricultural reforms in Sweden that led to Viking Period silver coin hoards surfacing at a rate never seen before or after Hildebrand's day; the 1864 edition of Hildebrand's Anglo-Saxon coins in the Swedish Royal Coin Cabinet drew on the evidence of 64 Swedish hoards alongside other European finds to establish the basic chronology of the late Anglo-Saxon coinage, much of which has remained valid after more than a century of subsequent research.

Hildebrand was the father of archaeologist Hans Hildebrand and teacher both to him and to archaeologist Oscar Montelius.

References 

1806 births
1884 deaths
People from Nybro Municipality
Swedish archaeologists
Lund University alumni
Numismatists
Members of the Swedish Academy
Members of the Royal Swedish Academy of Sciences
19th-century Swedish scientists